Siyahu Rural District is a rural district (dehestan) in the Fin District of Bandar Abbas County, Hormozgan Province, Iran. At the 2011 census, its population was 10156, in 2,215 families.  The rural district has 54 villages.

References 

Rural Districts of Hormozgan Province
Bandar Abbas County